Nelson Dewey Generating Station was a base load, coal-fired electrical power station located in Cassville, Wisconsin, in Grant County. The station was owned by Wisconsin Power and Light Company (WPL), an Alliant Energy company. It was shut down in late December 2015. The plant was demolished in late 2017.

It is named for Nelson Dewey (1813–1889), the first Governor of Wisconsin.

Units

See also

List of power stations in Wisconsin

References

External links
Zebra Muscles - New Sightings in Wisconsin (Archive)
Wisconsin Power and Light - Nelson Dewey Power Plant, Cassville, Wisconsin (Archive)
 https://web.archive.org/web/20160303190214/http://www.alliantenergy.com/docs/groups/public/documents/pub/p015319.pdf

Energy infrastructure completed in 1959
Energy infrastructure completed in 1962
Buildings and structures in Grant County, Wisconsin
Former coal-fired power stations in the United States
Alliant Energy
Coal-fired power stations in Wisconsin
Former power stations in Wisconsin